Sully may refer to:

 Chesley "Sully" Sullenberger (born 1951), American pilot notable for landing his disabled airliner on the Hudson
 Sully (film), a 2016 film by Clint Eastwood about Sullenberger

Places

France
 Sully, Calvados, commune in the department of Calvados
 Sully, Oise, commune in the department of Oise
 Sully, Saône-et-Loire, commune in the department of Saône-et-Loire
 Château de Sully, Saône-et-Loire department
 Sully-sur-Loire, commune in the department of Loiret

United Kingdom
 Sully, Vale of Glamorgan, a village in Wales
 Sully Island, an island of Wales

United States
 Sully, Iowa, a town
 Sully, West Virginia, an unincorporated community
 Sully County, South Dakota
 Sully Historic Site, Fairfax County, Virginia
 Fort Sully (Fort Leavenworth), an American Civil War artillery battery built west of Fort Leavenworth in 1864
 Fort Sully (South Dakota) (1863–1894), a military post originally built for the Indian Wars
 Sully Creek (South Dakota)

People with the surname or nickname
 Sully (surname)

As a placename within a person's name or title
 Eudes de Sully  (died 1208), Bishop of Paris
 Henry de Sully (died 1195), monk, Bishop of Worcester and Abbot of Glastonbury
 Henry de Sully (died 1189), Abbot of Fécamp, Bishop-designate of Salisbury and Archbishop-elect of York
 Hugh of Sully (French: Hugues de Sully), 13th century general under the Sicilian King Charles of Anjou
 Maurice de Sully (died 1196), Bishop of Paris who oversaw the building of Notre Dame
 Maximilien de Béthune, Duke of Sully (1560–1641), French soldier, statesman and minister who served King Henry IV of France
 William, Count of Sully (c. 1085–c. 1150), Count of Blois, Count of Chartres and jure uxoris Count of Sully, also known as William the Simple
 Henry de Sully (died 1336)

Nickname
 Salvatore Sully Erna (born 1968), lead vocalist of Godsmack
 Carlos Aneese Sully Kothmann (1933–1986), American pair skater
 Sully Montgomery (1901–1970), American National Football League player, boxer and sheriff
 Kevin O'Sullivan (baseball) (born 1968), head coach of the Florida Gators baseball team
 Sully Prudhomme (1839–1907), French poet, essayist and Nobel laureate
 Andrew Sullivan (born 1963), English-American journalist and political-blogging pioneer
 Anthony Sullivan (pitchman) (born 1969), English-American advertising figure
 Clive Sullivan (1943–1985), rugby player
 John 'Sully' Sullivan, from Third Watch
 Victor Sullivan, from the Uncharted video game series

Fictional characters
 Byron Sully, in Dr. Quinn, Medicine Woman 
 Jake Sully, protagonist of the 2009 film Avatar
 Sully the Aardvark, from Jungle Jam and Friends: The Radio Show!
 Sully and Biff, on Sesame Street
 Sulley, a character in Monsters Inc.
 Sully, a character in Fire Emblem Awakening
 Sully, a character in Kerosene by Chris Wooding
 Sully, a character in Danger Rangers
 Sully, a character in Commando
 Sully, a character in The Perfect Storm
 Sully, a character in The Warriors and its video game adaptation
 Victor Sullivan, a character in the Uncharted game series

Other uses
 Sully (band)
 Sully (dog), service dog used by George H.W. Bush
 Sully, a play about the life of Clive Sullivan, produced by Hull Truck Theatre
 French cruiser Sully, an armoured cruiser launched in 1901, run aground and wrecked in 1905

See also
 Sully-la-Chapelle, Loiret département, France
 Sully-sur-Loire, Loiret département, France
 Sulley (disambiguation)
 Sulli (disambiguation)